This is a list of years in North Macedonia, the country formerly named as "Republic of Macedonia" between 1991 and 2019.

18th century

19th century

20th century

21st century

 
History of Macedonia (region)
North Macedonia history-related lists
History of North Macedonia
Macedonia